The girls' 5 kilometre classical cross-country skiing competition at the 2020 Winter Youth Olympics was held on 21 January at the Vallée de Joux Cross-Country Centre.

Results
The race was started at 11:00.

References

Girls' 5 kilometre classical